The Chaldean mafia is a criminal organization composed of ethnic Assyrians  that have operated narcotics distribution networks from Phoenix and San Diego to Detroit. Involved in violent crimes such as armed robbery, arson, assault, homicide, and kidnapping.

Police investigations 
The work of the Detroit Metropolitan Violent Crime Task Force—with representatives from the FBI, the Bureau of Alcohol, Tobacco, Firearms and Explosives (ATF); the Drug Enforcement Administration (DEA), the Detroit Police Department, the Michigan State Police Department, and the Wayne County Sheriff's Office—resulted in the conviction of 111 subjects and the seizure of $5.3 million, 6.5 tons of marijuana, 25 kilograms of cocaine, five pounds of crystal methamphetamine, and 78 firearms.

In 2011 "Operation Shadowbox", a joint investigation between El Cajon, California police and the U.S. Drug Enforcement Administration into the trafficking of narcotics, firearms and explosives, allowed for the seizure of more than 13 pounds of methamphetamine; more than 5 pounds of ecstasy, pharmaceuticals, crack cocaine, heroin and cocaine; and more than 3,500 pounds of marijuana, most of which was likely smuggled through mastermind Furat Kalasho of Sterling Heights partnered with the Sinaloa Federation. Investigators also seized more than $630,000 in cash, three luxury cars, 34 firearms and four improvised explosive devices.

Operation Shadowbox 
"Operation Shadowbox" was a joint investigation between El Cajon Police and the U.S. Drug Enforcement Administration. On August 18, 2011 sixty Chaldeans were arrested at a Chaldean Social Club in El Cajon, near San Diego. This operation targeted mastermind Furat Kalasho of Sterling Heights, MI. SWAT teams served search warrants on the club late Wednesday night, seizing more than $160,000 in cash as well as evidence of illegal gambling.

See also 
Crime in Detroit, Michigan

References 
 George Knox, 2008, The Chaldean Mafia: A Preliminary Gang Threat, http://ngcrc.com./ngcrc/chaldprof.htm, National Gang Crime Research
 Louis Akrawi, 
 Detroit Free Press (Harry Kalasho murder), 2010, 
 Court of Appeals Document (Ray Akrawi), 2010, http://cases.justia.com/us-court-of-appeals/F2/951/350/257887/
 Court of Appeals Document (Louis Akrawi), 2010, 
 Sign On San Diego, "60 Arrested", 2011, http://www.signonsandiego.com/news/2011/aug/18/60-arrested-el-cajon-chaldean-organized-crime-case/

Citations 

Mafia
Assyrian gangs
Organized crime by ethnic or national origin
Iraqi-American history
Assyrian-American organizations
Organized crime groups in the United States
Gangs in Detroit